Alexander Hamilton Wallis (March 28, 1872 – July 25, 1959) was an American college football player.  He played tackle for the Yale Bulldogs football team of Yale University from 1890 to 1892, and was selected as an All-American in 1892.

Wallis was the son of Hamilton Wallis, a prominent lawyer of  East Orange, New Jersey.  He had a brother, Nathan C. Wallis and a sister, Emeline Waldron Wallis, who married James Carr Dunn of London, England.

Though Wallis was a lineman, he was a frequent ball carrier for Yale.  In November 1892, an article reported that Wallis was running with the ball in his old form, getting off to a quick start, "hitting the line hard and tackling equally hard."

References

1872 births
1959 deaths
19th-century players of American football
American football tackles
All-American college football players
Yale Bulldogs football players
Sportspeople from East Orange, New Jersey
Sportspeople from Jersey City, New Jersey